The Lake Shkodër Nature Reserve is a nature reserve in northwestern Albania.

See also   
 Protected areas of Albania 
 Geography of Albania
 Biodiversity of Albania

References 

Nature reserves in Albania
Tourist attractions in Albania
Geography of Shkodër County
Tourist attractions in Shkodër County
Ramsar sites in Albania
Important Bird Areas of Albania
Forests of Albania